Bonghwasan Station is a railway station in Jungnang-gu, Seoul. It was the eastern terminus of Seoul Subway Line 6 until December 21, 2019, though many eastbound trains still terminate here, as Sinnae station is only allowed to accommodate 1 train at a time as the Line 6 station only has one track and one platform, but it will be expanded to 2 tracks and 2 platforms in the future.

Station layout

References

Seoul Metropolitan Subway stations
Metro stations in Jungnang District
Railway stations opened in 2000